Alexander Alexeyevich Shaganov  (March 4, 1965, Moscow) is a Russian poet and songwriter, lyricist for many well-known pop songs.

In 1987 he graduated from the Moscow Electrotechnical Institute of Communications. He worked as a telecommunications engineer  Mostelefonstroy operator recording studio Zvuk, he gave concerts as a singer.

Alexander Shaganov's fame came with the song  Vladimir Rus''' to the music of Dmitri Warsawsky band Chorny Kofe (1986) in the wake of the interest of the domestic audience to hard rock and heavy metal.Ля-Минор, Шаганов

He worked as a lyricist with Dmitry Malikov, Zhenya Belousov, Alexander Rybkin, Sergey Chumakov, Sofia Rotaru, Vlad Stashevsky, Yevgeny Kulikov, Alexander Kalyanov, Alexander Barykin, Alla Pugacheva, Katya Lel, the groups Lyube, Na Na, Ivanushki International, Korni. Music for many poems written by Shaganov is by a friend of the poet, composer Igor Matvienko.

Winner of Ovation (1992) and the Valentin Kataev Prize (the magazine Yunost, 1996).

In 2007 he published a book with the publishing house Tsentrpoligraf  Alexander Shaganov I Shaganov for Moscow''.

References

External links
 Official site 

Living people
1965 births
Russian songwriters
Soviet songwriters
Soviet poets
Soviet male writers
20th-century Russian male writers
Russian male poets
Russian-language poets
Writers from Moscow